In cricket, a five-wicket haul (also known as a "five-for" or "fifer") refers to a bowler taking five or more wickets in a single innings. This is regarded as a significant achievement. As of May 2021, 159 cricketers have taken a five-wicket haul on their debut in a Test match, with eleven of them being taken by Pakistani players. They have taken a five-wicket haul on debut against seven different opponents: three times against New Zealand and Australia, and once against Bangladesh, England, India, South Africa and Zimbabwe each. Of the eleven occasions, Pakistan won the match four times, and drew seven times. The players have taken five-wicket hauls at nine different venues, including six outside Pakistan; three of them have achieved the feat at the National Stadium, Karachi.

Arif Butt was the first Pakistani player to take a five-wicket haul on his Test debut, he took six wickets for 89 runs against Australia in 1964. Mohammad Nazir and Mohammad Zahid are the only bowlers to have taken seven wickets each. Butt and Tanvir Ahmed have taken six wickets each and six others have taken five wickets on debut. Zahid took seven wickets for 66 runs, the best bowling figures by a Pakistani bowler on debut, against New Zealand in 1996, at the Rawalpindi Cricket Stadium. He accumulated 11 wickets for 130 runs in the match, the only Pakistani to take 10 or more wickets in a Test match on debut. Amongst the bowlers, Bilal Asif is the most economical, with 1.67 runs per over, and Zahid has the best strike rate. As of 2021, the most recent bowler to achieve the feat was Nauman Ali. He took five wickets for 35 runs against South Africa in 2021 at the National Stadium.

Abrar Ahmed became the first Pakistani bowler to five-wicket haul in the opening session of a test match and also on debut.

Key

Five-wicket hauls

See also
 List of Test cricketers who have taken five wickets on debut

References

Notes

Specific

debut
Pakistan

Test